Nemanja Dangubić (born 13 April 1993) is a Serbian professional basketball player for Promitheas Patras of the Greek Basket League and the EuroCup. He was selected by the Philadelphia 76ers with the 54th overall pick in the 2014 NBA draft.

Professional career
In 2010, Dangubić joined the Hemofarm junior team, before joining the senior team for the 2011–12 season.

In July 2012, Dangubić signed with Mega Vizura.

Crvena zvezda (2014–2018) 
On 31 July 2014 Dangubić signed a three-year deal with an opt-out clause after each season with Crvena zvezda. In 2014–15 season, Crvena zvezda won the Adriatic League championship, the Serbian League championship and the Radivoj Korać Cup.

On 10 July 2016 he re-signed with the team until the end of 2017–18 season. In March 2018, it was announced that Dangubić will miss the remainder of the 2017–18 season due to knee injury. He left Zvezda in summer 2018.

Bayern Munich (2018–2019) 
On 18 September 2018 Bayern Munich of the Basketball Bundesliga (BBL) was reported to have signed Dangubić to a one-year deal.

Estudiantes (2019–2020) 
In July 2019, Dangubić signed with the Spanish club Estudiantes.

Partizan (2020–2022) 
On 10 July 2020, Dangubić signed a two-year contract with Partizan Belgrade. In the 2020–21 ABA season, he averaged 7.5 points and 2.9 rebounds over 24 games. In July 2022, he left Partizan.

Promitheas Patras (2022–present)
On October 18, 2022, Dangubić signed with Greek EuroCup side Promitheas Patras for the rest of the season, replacing Jericole Hellems.

NBA draft rights 
On 26 June 2014 Dangubić was selected with the 54th overall pick in the 2014 NBA draft by the Philadelphia 76ers. He was later traded to the San Antonio Spurs on draft night. On 6 July 2019 his draft right was traded to the Brooklyn Nets in a three-team trade.

International career
Dangubić helped Serbia win silver medals at the 2011 U19 World Championships and the 2011 U18 European Championships. While originally in line to make the Serbian squad for the 2014 FIBA Basketball World Cup, Dangubić was forced to leave the team's training camp before it had actually begun after suffering from a knee injury.

Career statistics

Euroleague

|-
| style="text-align:left;"| 2014–15
| style="text-align:left;"| Crvena zvezda
| 23 || 11 || 14.2 || 38.2 || 34.2 || 68.4 || 2.0 || 0.7 || 0.4 || 0.1 || 4.1 || 1.9
|-
| style="text-align:left;"| 2015–16
| style="text-align:left;"| Crvena zvezda
| 19 || 15 || 15.9 || 55.1 || 45.2 || 69.2 || 1.9 || 0.8 || 0.3 || 0.1 || 5.2 || 3.4
|-
| style="text-align:left;"| 2016–17
| style="text-align:left;"| Crvena zvezda
| 24 || 24 || 19.3 || 38.2 || 29.6 || 84.2 || 2.0 || 0.7 || 0.6 || 0.1 || 5.3 || 2.5
|-
| style="text-align:left;"| 2017–18
| style="text-align:left;"| Crvena zvezda
| 18 || 15 || 20.2 || 46.9 || 46.8 || 80.0 || 3.4 || 1.2 || 0.7 || 0.1 || 7.4 || 6.7
|-
| style="text-align:left;"| 2018–19
| style="text-align:left;"| Bayern Munich
| 30 || 1 || 14.8 || 41.2 || 39.5 || 75.7 || 2.4 || 0.5 || 0.3 || 0.1 || 4.2 || 3.9
|- class="sortbottom"
| style="text-align:center;" colspan=2| Career
| 84 || 65 || 17.3 || 42.3 || 38.2 || 76.3 || 2.3 || 0.8 || 0.5 || 0.1 || 5.4 || 3.4

Eurocup

Domestic leagues

See also 
 List of KK Crvena zvezda players with 100 games played
 List of NBA drafted players from Serbia
 Philadelphia 76ers draft history

References

External links

 Nemanja Dangubić at aba-liga.com
 Nemanja Dangubić at draftexpress.com
 Nemanja Dangubić at eurobasket.com
 Nemanja Dangubić at euroleague.net
 Nemanja Dangubić at fiba.com
 

1993 births
Living people
ABA League players
Basketball League of Serbia players
CB Estudiantes players
FC Bayern Munich basketball players
KK Crvena zvezda players
KK Hemofarm players
KK Mega Basket players
KK Partizan players
Liga ACB players
Philadelphia 76ers draft picks
Power forwards (basketball)
Promitheas Patras B.C. players
Serbian expatriate basketball people in Germany
Serbian expatriate basketball people in Greece
Serbian expatriate basketball people in Spain
Serbian men's basketball players
Small forwards
Sportspeople from Pančevo